The Anne Springs Close Greenway is an extensive protected natural area in Fort Mill, South Carolina consisting of approximately 2,100 acres (9.3 km2) of lakes, forests, and pastures that include trails for hiking, biking, kayaking, and horseback riding.  The land for the greenway was donated in 1995 by the family of Anne Springs Close, a lifelong supporter of recreation and the environment.  It is run by Leroy Springs & Company.

The greenway presents summer concerts and also provides facilities for picnicking, camping, and mountain biking.

Recreation Complex
The Recreation Complex at 971 Tom Hall Street was gifted to the Town of Fort Mill by the 501(c)(3) nonprofit organization, Leroy Springs & Company, Inc. in 2019. It serves as the Complex Branch of the Upper Palmetto YMCA and is run in partnership with the Fort Mill School District.  It includes a multipurpose athletic field, three baseball diamonds, and six tennis courts, as well as a gym, two indoor swimming pools and a spa whirlpool open all year. The Town of Fort Mill's Parks and Recreation Department utilizes the Complex facilities for Youth Sports programming.

References

Greenways
Parks in South Carolina
Fort Mill, South Carolina